Gol Mir (also Romanized as Gol Mīr; also known as Deh-e Gol Mīr and Gol-e Mīr Karam) is a village in Margan Rural District, in the Central District of Hirmand County, Sistan and Baluchestan Province, Iran. At the 2006 census, its population was 36, in 8 families.

References 

Populated places in Hirmand County